This is a list of the  South African champions in the sport of ice hockey.

Champions

References

Ice hockey in South Africa